José Héctor Rial Laguía (14 October 1928 – 24 February 1991) was a footballer who played as a forward for Real Madrid between 1954 and 1961, and was part of the team that won five consecutive European Cups. He played professional football in Argentina, Colombia, Uruguay, Spain, France and Chile. He was born and raised in Argentina, but represented the Spain national team on five occasions.

Rial started playing professional football in 1947 with San Lorenzo de Almagro in the Primera Division Argentina. In July 1949, he moved to Colombia to play for Independiente Santa Fe. After two seasons with the club, he moved to Uruguay to join Nacional where he was part of the championship-winning side of 1952.

In 1954 Rial joined Spanish giants Real Madrid, where he played for seven years, amassing ten major titles with the team. In his last season playing for the club, mostly as a substitute, he was loaned to play for Unión Española in Chile for five months.

In 1961, Rial left Madrid to join Espanyol in Barcelona, but he left the club after a disappointing season, where the club finished 13th of the 16 teams in La Liga.

Rial's final season was the 1962-63 campaign with the French club Olympique de Marseille, which finished at the bottom of the league, and he retired at the end of the season.

Career statistics

Honours
 Nacional
 Primera División Uruguaya: 1952

 Real Madrid
 European Cup: 1956, 1957, 1958, 1959, 1960
 Intercontinental Cup: 1960
 Spanish League Championship: 1955, 1957, 1958, 1961

See also
List of Spain international footballers born outside Spain

References

External links
 
Real Madrid profile 

1928 births
1991 deaths
People from Pergamino
Spanish footballers
Spain international footballers
Argentine footballers
Argentine people of Spanish descent
Citizens of Spain through descent
Argentine emigrants to Spain
San Lorenzo de Almagro footballers
Independiente Santa Fe footballers
Club Nacional de Football players
La Liga players
Real Madrid CF players
RCD Espanyol footballers
Olympique de Marseille players
Unión Española footballers
Ligue 1 players
Argentine Primera División players
Categoría Primera A players
Uruguayan Primera División players
Argentine expatriate footballers
Expatriate footballers in Chile
Expatriate footballers in Colombia
Expatriate footballers in France
Expatriate footballers in Uruguay
Argentine football managers
RCD Mallorca managers
Estudiantes de La Plata managers
Deportivo de La Coruña managers
UD Las Palmas managers
Real Zaragoza managers
Elche CF managers
Argentine expatriate sportspeople in France
Argentine expatriate sportspeople in Spain
Expatriate football managers in Mexico
Expatriate football managers in Saudi Arabia
C.D. Guadalajara managers
Atlas F.C. managers
Association football forwards
UEFA Champions League winning players
Sportspeople from Buenos Aires Province